SS President Wilson was an American passenger ship originally ordered by the Maritime Commission (MC hull 687) during World War II, as one of the Admiral W. S. Benson-class Type P2-SE2-R1 transport ships, and intended to be named USS Admiral F.B. Upham (AP-129), but she was launched just after the war ended. in 1948, The ship was put into service for the American President Lines. The ship remained in service for the shipping company until 1973. She was sold to Oceanic Cruise Development before eventually, scrapped at Kaohsiung.

Background
The President Wilson and her sister ship the SS President Cleveland, was originally planned to be commissioned by the United States Maritime Commission in a series of eight troop carriers and supply ships of the type P2-SE2-R1 (Admirals) class ships. All ships of this class were designed to be used as a Passenger ship which could be readily converted into a troop transport ships during wartime service. However during construction, she and President Cleveland were canceled and so because of that the ships later converted into passenger liners.

History
The ship was laid down on November 27, 1944 at the Bethlehem Steel shipyard in Alameda, California, but was canceled on December 16,1944. The ship was finally launched on November 24,1947, completed and delivered to the Maritime Commission on April 27, 1948. Under the name SS President Wilson, she was bareboat chartered by the Maritime Commission to American President Lines. During its service with APL, President Wilson operated on a Pacific Ocean route, traveling from San Francisco to Los Angeles, Hawaii, or the far east before returning back to San Francisco. By the late 1950s, passenger liners were being eclipsed by jet airplanes as the preferred mode of trans-oceanic travel, but APL redirected its marketing efforts to pleasure travelers and continued its liner service well past the retirement of many of President Wilson’s contemporaries. The ship remained in service until 1960 without major incidents. It was then modernized in San Francisco. In 1962 President Wilson moved from San Francisco to Yokohama. In 1970 the ship was decommissioned and sold due to falling passenger numbers.

She was sold to Oceanic Cruise Development, Inc. (C.Y. Tung Group) on April 27, 1973, and renamed Oriental Empress. Laid up at Hong Kong, the ship was eventually scrapped at Kaohsiung, Taiwan, in 1984.

References

 
 

1947 ships
Ships built in Alameda, California
Type P2 ships